Andreas Wahl (born 2 July 1983) is a Norwegian physicist and professional communicator of science.

In the show Med livet som innsats, Andreas demonstrates the laws of physics by putting his life in high-risk situations. He was also the presenter of the TV-show  Folkeopplysningen on the national broadcaster NRK1.

Bibliography
 ; (Why does cheese melt, but not ham?: Things children ask), 2015
 ; (Magic with physics), 2013
 ; (Up close - peculiar - spectacular; 63 natural science tricks and experiments), 2010

References 

1983 births
Norwegian physicists
Norwegian non-fiction writers
Living people
Place of birth missing (living people)
21st-century physicists
21st-century Norwegian male writers
Science communicators
Male non-fiction writers